The City is an urban novel by Ukrainian writer Valerian Pidmohylny, published in 1928. 
Pidmohylny created the modern novel, which is focused on urban problems and touches upon philosophical questions of being. In this novel psyche of the characters is analyzed and the conflict takes place between people with different worldviews. Misto is the first urban novel in the Ukrainian literature, with new characters, issues and narrative style.

History of writing 

In the novel Valerian Pidmohylny described the Ukrainian peasant youth, who in the early 1920s went in thousands to the cities to conquer them, pour a fresh peasant blood into them, and liquidate the Ukrainian antagonism between the city and the country. 
The novel was not like a traditional populist prose of the 19th century because the European novel of the 19th – early 20th century guided the author. He learned tradition of Romance of Honoré de Balzac, Guy de Maupassant, Anatole France, Jack London, and domestic – Ahatanhel Krymsky, Volodymyr Vynnychenko.

Features of plotline 

The story is presented by the history of the soul of Stepan Radchenko. He is an energetic rural young man who arrives in Kyiv to get into the economic university and hopes to come back with new knowledge to the village.
Stepan has got nothing in the capital of Ukraine. Nevertheless, over time, there is a gradual conquest of the city. Stepan settles down in the suburbs where life is not much different from rural. Later he moves closer to the center, rents a separate apartment. At the end of the novel, he feels himself the owner of the city: "It lies humbly beneath wavy rocks, marked by points of fire, and stretches him from the darkness of the hills sharp stone fingers."
In short, it is Impressionism: from fragments of things, people and sounds author makes a portrait of the city. As Stepan assimilates in Kyiv, it changes his perception.
Changing of the clothes accompanies his becoming a proletarian. At the beginning, secretary of the bureau advises Radchenko to change clothes: "All the Ukrainian woes are because of dressing badly." Before the store with fashionable and expensive clothes Stepan still believes that it should only change his appearance and he can create something extraordinary. When he moves to a new house, Stepan burns his old clothes. During the novel one canobserve that Stephen rises the ladder of the city life. In Kyiv he becomes interested in literature,  begins writing, and eventually, he becomes a famous writer. He was convinced that he went to conquer the city. Stepan thought the city needed "fresh blood of the village" that will change  "its appearance and being. And he is one of the changes which must win." However, gradually the thought of returning disappear. 
Pidmohylny does not have a goal to make a documentary description of the writer's medium. He shows the birth of the author, his successes and failures, his wanderings in different worlds of the novel. The last sentence of the novel ends at the instant when the story of Stepan Radchenko begins: "Then, in the silence of the lamp over the table he wrote a story about people."

Characters 

 Stepan Radchenko – the protagonist
 Nadia – a girl from the village
 Levko – a student
 Hanna and Nyusya – Nadia’s friends
 Luka Hnidy – a shopkeeper, who rents out to Stepan
 Tamara (Musinka) – a shopkeeper's wife, Stepan’s mistress
 Maxym – a son of Tamara and shopkeeper
 Borys – a student, Stepan’s friend
 Zoska – a city girl, Stepan’s mistress
 Ryta – a ballerina
 Vyhorsky – a poet, Stepan’s friend.

See also

 List of Ukrainian-language writers
 Ukrainian literature

References 
 Підмогильний В. Оповідання, повість, романи. — Київ: Наукова думка, 1991
 Підмогильний В. Місто. — К.: Школа, 2008 (передмова та навчально-методичні матеріали Олени Лещенко)
 Н. І. Гноєва. Український інтелектуальний роман 20-х років XX століття в оцінці Ю. Шевельова
 Місто як простір самотності: ґендерний вимір Журавська О.В.
 :uk:Місто (роман)

Ukrainian novels
1928 novels
Ukrainian-language books